Transpersonal psychology, or spiritual psychology, is a sub-field or school of psychology that claims to integrate the spiritual and transcendent aspects of the human experience with the framework of modern psychology. The transpersonal is defined as "experiences in which the sense of  identity or self extends beyond (trans) the individual or personal to encompass wider aspects of humankind, life, psyche or cosmos". It has also been defined as "development beyond conventional, personal or individual levels".

Issues considered in transpersonal psychology include spiritual self-development, self beyond the ego, peak experiences, mystical experiences, systemic trance, spiritual crises, spiritual evolution, religious conversion, altered states of consciousness, spiritual practices, and other sublime and/or unusually expanded experiences of living. The discipline attempts to describe and integrate spiritual experience within modern psychological theory and to formulate new theory to encompass such experience. The Transpersonal Psychology Day is celebrated on February 27.

History

Origins 
In 1968 Abraham Maslow was among the people who announced transpersonal psychology as a "fourth force" in psychology, in order to separate it from Humanistic psychology. Early use of the term "transpersonal" can also be credited to Stanislav Grof and Anthony Sutich. At this time, in 1967–68, Maslow was in close dialogue with both Grof and Sutich regarding the name and orientation of the new field. According to Powers the term "transpersonal" starts to show up in academic journals from 1970 onwards.

Both Humanistic and Transpersonal psychology have been associated with the Human Potential Movement, a growth center for alternative therapies and philosophies that grew out of the counter-culture of the 1960s at places such as Esalen, California.

Formative period

Gradually, during the 1960s, the term "transpersonal" was associated with a distinct school of psychology within the humanistic psychology movement. In 1969,  Maslow, Grof and Sutich were among the initiators behind the publication of the first issue of the Journal of Transpersonal Psychology. The Association for Transpersonal Psychology was established in 1972, the International Transpersonal Psychology Association in 1973, and the Institute of Transpersonal Psychology in 1975 . The institute was founded by Robert Frager and James Fadiman in response to the academic climate that was hostile to such ideas. Soon other institutions begain offering curricula in transpersonal psychology including Saybrook Graduate School, the California Institute of Asian Studies (now California Institute of Integral Studies), JFK University, and Naropa. Other proponents of transpersonal psychology included Ram Dass, a popular Guru; Elmer and Alyce Green who were affiliated with the Menninger Foundation; and Ken Wilber. 

An early preoccupation of those interested in transpersonal psychology was meditation and altered states of consciousness including those induced from psychedelic drugs. 

In the early 1980s a group within APA division 32 (Humanistic Psychology) argued in favor of establishing transpersonal psychology as a separate division within the framework of the American Psychological Association. A petition was presented to the APA Council in 1984, but was turned down. A new initiative was made in 1985, but it failed to win the majority of votes in the council. In 1986 the petition  was presented for a third and final time, but was withdrawn by the executive board of Division 32. The interest group later re-formed as the Transpersonal Psychology Interest Group (TPIG), and continued to promote transpersonal issues in collaboration with Division 32. Ken Wilber and Michael Washburn delivered the main transpersonal models of development of this period, Wilber in 1977 and Washburn in 1988. Ken Wilber has been distancing himself from the label of "transpersonal", in favour of the label of "integral", since the mid-1990s. In 1998 he formed Integral Institute.

Later developments

Proponents of transpersonal psychology were behind the proposal for a new diagnostic category to be included in the DSM-manual of the American Psychiatric Association. The category was called "Psychoreligious or psychospiritual problem" and was approved by the Task Force on DSM-IV in 1993, after changing its name to Religious or spiritual problem. Concurrently, there was an increase in membership for the Association for Transpersonal Psychology, stabilizing at approximately 3000 members in the early nineties. In 1996, the British Psychological Society established a Transpersonal Psychology Section.

In 2007 the Journal of Transpersonal Psychology and the International Journal of Transpersonal Studies were accepted for indexing in PsycINFO, the journal database of the American Psychological Association. However, that same year, Ruzek, who conducted interviews with founders of Transpersonal Psychology, as well as historians of American psychology, noted that the "American Psychological Association (APA) and most academic institutions have not yet recognized transpersonal psychology as an approved area of study; transpersonal psychology is rarely mentioned in mainstream academic journals or textbooks; and relatively few American academicians identify themselves as practitioners of transpersonal psychology. Furthermore, transpersonal psychology is scarcely mentioned, if at all, in history or introductory psychology texts". 

In 2012 the Institute of Transpersonal Psychology announced that it was changing its name to Sofia University with an expanded graduate program featuring computer science and business. In 2016, the California Institute of Integral Studies launched an online PhD degree in Integral and Transpersonal Psychology, founded and chaired by Glenn Hartelius, including Jorge Ferrer on its faculty, and sponsoring publication of the International Journal of Transpersonal Studies.

Branches and related fields
Other transpersonal disciplines, such as transpersonal anthropology and transpersonal business studies, are listed as transpersonal disciplines. 

Other fields of study that are related to transpersonal psychology, include near-death studies and parapsychology. 

A few commentators have suggested that there is a difference between transpersonal psychology and a broader category of transpersonal theories, sometimes called transpersonal studies. According to Friedman this category might  include several approaches to the transpersonal that lie outside the frames of science. However, according to Ferrer the field of transpersonal psychology is "situated within the wider umbrella of transpersonal studies".

Transpersonal psychology may also be associated with New Age beliefs and pop psychology. However, leading authors in the field, among those Sovatsky, Rowan, and Hartelius have criticized the nature of "New Age"-philosophy and discourse. Rowan even states that "The Transpersonal is not the New Age". Other commentators, such as Wade, notes that the field remains part of the New Age, despite the fact that transpersonal psychologists may want no such association.

Although some consider that the distinction between transpersonal psychology and the psychology of religion is fading (e.g. The Oxford Handbook of Psychology and Spirituality), there is still generally considered to be a clear distinction between the two. Much of the focus of psychology of religion is concerned with issues that would not be considered 'transcendent' within transpersonal psychology, so the two disciplines have quite distinct focuses.

Organizations, publications and locations
Although the perspective of transpersonal psychology has spread to a number of interest groups across the US and Europe, its origins were in California, and the field has always been strongly associated with institutions on the west coast of the US. Both the Association for Transpersonal Psychology and the forerunner to Sofia University were founded in the state of California, and a number of the fields leading theorists come from this area of the US. A European counterpart to the American institution, the European Transpersonal Psychology Association (ETPA), was founded much later.

Leading publications include the Journal of Transpersonal Psychology and the International Journal of Transpersonal Studies. Smaller publications include the Transpersonal Psychology Review, the journal of the Transpersonal Psychology Section of the British Psychological Society.

Reception, recognition and criticism

Reception of Transpersonal psychology in the surrounding culture reflects a wide range of views and opinions, including severe skepticism. Ernest Hilgard, representing the contemporary psychology of the early 1980s, regarded transpersonal psychology as a fringe movement that attracted the more extreme followers of Humanistic psychology. He did however remark that such movements might enrich the topics that psychologists study, even though most psychologists choose not to join the movement. Adams also regarded Transpersonal psychology as a fringe discipline. He also observed its status as a controversial field of study.

Eugene Taylor, representing the field of Humanistic Psychology, presented a balanced review of transpersonal psychology in the early nineties. On the negative side he mentioned transpersonal Psychology's tendency toward being "philosophically naive, poorly financed, at times almost anti-intellectual, and frequently overrated as far as its influences". On the positive side he noted the fields "integrated approach to understanding the phenomenology of scientific method"; the "centrality of qualitative research"; and the "importance of interdisciplinary communication". In conclusion he suggested that the virtues of transpersonal psychology may, in the end, "outweigh its defects". In a later article Taylor regarded transpersonal psychology as a visionary American folk-psychology with little historical relation to American academic psychology, except through its association with Humanistic psychology and the categories of transcendence and consciousness.

Although transpersonal psychology has experienced some minor recognition from the surrounding culture, it faces a fair amount of skepticism and criticism from the same surroundings. Freeman mentions that the early field of transpersonal psychology was aware of the possibility that it would be rejected by the scientific community. Its method of inner empiricism, "based on disciplined introspection", was to be a target of skepticism from outsiders in the years to come. Several commentators have mentioned the controversial aspects of transpersonal psychology. Zdenek noted that the field was regarded as "controversial since its inception". Other commentators, such as Friedman, and Adams, also mention the controversial status of the field. Adams also remarked that the field has struggled for "recognition as a legitimate field of study" in academia. This aspect was also noticed by Parsons, who observed that Transpersonal psychology's "naive perennialism, misreading of religious texts, lack of methodological sophistication, weak epistemology, and, some would claim, promotion of narcissistic self-absorption" had not been well received by the majority of academics. Commenting on the state of the field in the mid-nineties Chinen noted that professional publications, until then, had been hesitant to publish articles that dealt with transpersonal subjects. 

In 1998 the San Francisco Chronicle reported on the holistic studies program at the John F. Kennedy University in Orinda, which included a transpersonal psychology department. The program was considered to be unique at the time, but also controversial. Commentators presented their skepticism towards the program. Another contentious aspect concerns the topic of psychedelic substances. Commenting upon the controversial status of psychedelic and entheogenic substances in contemporary culture, authors Elmer, MacDonald & Friedman observe that these drugs have been used for therapeutic effect in the transpersonal movement, but - the authors add - this is not the most "common form of transpersonal intervention"  in contemporary therapy. However, Bravo and Grob note that "the place of psychedelics in spiritual practice remains controversial". 

Ruzek, who interviewed founders of transpersonal psychology, as well as historians of American psychology, found that the field of Transpersonal psychology had made little impact on the larger field of psychology in America. Among the factors that contributed to this situation was mainstream psychology's "resistance to spiritual and philosophical ideas", and the tendency of Transpersonal psychologists to isolate themselves from the larger context.

One of the earliest criticisms of transpersonal psychology was leveled by the humanistic psychologist Rollo May, who "disputed the conceptual foundations of transpersonal psychology". May also criticized the field for neglecting the personal dimension of the psyche by elevating the pursuit of the transcendental, and for neglecting the "dark side of human nature". 

According to Lukoff and Lu the American Psychological Association expressed some concerns about the "unscientific" nature of transpersonal psychology at the time of the petition to the APA (see above). Rowan notes that the Association had serious reservations about opening up a Transpersonal Psychology Division. The petitions for divisional status failed to win the majority of votes in the APA council, and the division was never established. Commentators also mention that transpersonal psychology's association with the ideas of religion was one of the concerns that prohibited it from becoming a separate division of the APA at the time of the petition in 1984.

Transpersonal psychology has been criticized for lacking conceptual, evidentiary, and scientific rigor. In a review of criticisms of the field, Cunningham writes, "philosophers have criticized transpersonal psychology because its metaphysics is naive and epistemology is undeveloped. Multiplicity of definitions and lack of operationalization of many of its concepts has led to a conceptual confusion about the nature of transpersonal psychology itself (i.e., the concept is used differently by different theorists and means different things to different people). Biologists have criticized transpersonal psychology for its lack of attention to biological foundations of behavior and experience. Physicists have criticized transpersonal psychology for inappropriately accommodating physic concepts as explanations of consciousness."

Albert Ellis, a cognitive psychologist and humanist, has questioned the results of transpersonal psychotherapy. In 1989 he cooperated with Raymond Yeager for the release of Why some therapies don't work: The dangers of transpersonal psychology, where the authors compared the results of transpersonal psychology with the effects of Rational-Emotive Therapy, noting the dangers of the transpersonal approach. Ellis has also questioned the scientific status of transpersonal psychology, and its relationship to religion, mysticism and authoritarian belief systems.

See also
 Claudio Naranjo
 Indian psychology
 Near-death studies
 Neurotheology
 Transpersonal anthropology

References

Further reading
 Davis, John V. (2003). Transpersonal psychology in Taylor, B. and Kaplan, J., Eds. The Encyclopedia of Religion and Nature. Bristol, England: Thoemmes Continuum.
 Gripentrog, Stephanie (2018). Mapping the Boundaries between Science and Religion: Psychology, Psychiatry, and Near-Death Experiences. In: Lüddeckens, D., & Schrimpf, M. (2018). Medicine - religion - spirituality: Global perspectives on traditional, complementary, and alternative healing. Bielefeld: transcript Verlag. , pp. 241–272.
 Rowan, John. (1993) The Transpersonal: Psychotherapy and Counselling. London: Routledge
 
 Taylor, Steve. (2015, September 15). "Transpersonal Psychology: Exploring the Farther Reaches of Human Nature". Psychology Today.

External links
 The Association for Transpersonal Psychology (ATP)
 European Transpersonal Association
 International Journal of Transpersonal Studies Organ of the International Transpersonal Association
 Sofia University (formerly the Institute of Transpersonal Psychology)
 Journal of Transpersonal Research Organ of the European Transpersonal Association
 International Journal for Transformative Research

 
Psychological schools
Clinical psychology
Transpersonal studies
Meditation
New Age practices